Anthony McGrady (born 28 March 1944) is an Australian politician. He was a Member of the Queensland Legislative Assembly and Mayor of the City of Mount Isa.

Early life 
Born in Liverpool in the United Kingdom, he moved to Mount Isa in Queensland, Australia.

Politics 
From 1985 to 1989 McGrady served as mayor in the City of Mount Isa.

A member of the Labor Party, he was elected to the Legislative Assembly of Queensland in 1989 as the member for Mount Isa. He was Minister for Mines and Energy 1998–2001, moving to Police and Corrective Services in 2001 and to State Development and Innovation in 2004. On 9 August 2005, he was elected Speaker of the Legislative Assembly, succeeding Ray Hollis, who resigned from parliament. McGrady was Speaker until the next election was called on 9 October 2006, after which he retired from state politics.

At the 2012 Queensland local government elections, he was again elected Mayor of Mount Isa, until his retirement in 2016.

References

1944 births
Living people
Members of the Queensland Legislative Assembly
Mayors of places in Queensland
People from Mount Isa
Speakers of the Queensland Legislative Assembly
Australian Labor Party members of the Parliament of Queensland
21st-century Australian politicians